Hargis is an unincorporated community in Grant Parish, Louisiana, United States.

Notable person
Jesse C. Deen, Louisiana politician, lived in Hargis.

Notes

Unincorporated communities in Grant Parish, Louisiana
Unincorporated communities in Louisiana